Sir Wilfrid Thomas Southorn  (4 August 1879 – 15 March 1957) (Chinese Translated Name: 修頓, Old Translated Name:蕭敦), known as Tom, was a British colonial administrator, spending the large part of his career in Ceylon (now Sri Lanka) before serving as Colonial Secretary of Hong Kong, then Governor of The Gambia.

Education 
He was educated at Warwick School and Corpus Christi College, Oxford.

Colonial service career 
He had joined the Ceylon Civil Service in 1903, and was appointed Additional Assistant Colonial Secretary in 1909, Principal Assistant Colonial Secretary in 1920, and Principal Collector of Customs and Chairman of the Post Commission in 1923.

He was the Colonial Secretary of Hong Kong from 1925 to 1936 and served as Acting Administrator of the colony from February to March 1930 and from May to September 1935, and then in November the same year, at either end of the tenure of Sir William Peel as governor. His official (summer) residence was Mountain Lodge.

In 1936, he was made Governor of the Gambia, notably describing the colony as "a geographical and economic absurdity". He left The Gambia in March 1942.

Personal life 
In 1921 he married author Bella Sidney Woolf (1877–1960), whom he met through her (later) more famous brother Leonard Woolf, when the two men were colleagues in Ceylon. In 1904, then a humble 'Office Assistant', Southorn had met Leonard Woolf on his arrival in Ceylon from England.

Legacy
Southorn Playground in Wan Chai, Hong Kong was named for him in 1934, while he was Colonial Secretary.  Also bearing his name are the associated Southorn Stadium and adjacent Southorn Centre.

References

Chief Secretaries of Hong Kong
Governors of the Gambia
1879 births
1957 deaths
People educated at Warwick School
Alumni of Corpus Christi College, Oxford
People from Warwickshire
Knights Commander of the Order of St Michael and St George
Knights Commander of the Order of the British Empire
Companions of the Order of St Michael and St George
Members of the Legislative Council of Ceylon